Edmond Baird Ryckman,  (April 15, 1866 – January 11, 1934) was a Canadian politician.

His father, E.B. Ryckman, was a Methodist minister.  He was educated at Brantford Collegiate Institute, the University of Toronto, and Osgoode Hall.

Born in Huntingdon, Canada East, he was first elected to the House of Commons of Canada for the riding of Toronto East in the 1921 federal election. A Conservative, he was re-elected in 1925, 1926, and 1930.

In 1926, he was the Minister of Public Works in the short lived cabinet of Arthur Meighen; when he accepted the post he resigned his position as president of the Dunlop Tire and Rubber Goods Company.

From 1930 to 1933, he was the Minister of National Revenue.

References

External links

1866 births
1934 deaths
Lawyers in Ontario
Conservative Party of Canada (1867–1942) MPs
Members of the House of Commons of Canada from Ontario
Members of the King's Privy Council for Canada
People from Montérégie
Anglophone Quebec people